Bohal may refer to:

 Bohal, Morbihan, France
 Bohal, Bhiwani, India
 Bohal, Iran